The cinereous owl (Strix sartorii) or Mexican barred owl, is an owl that is endemic to Mexico.

Taxonomy and systematics

The cinereous owl has variously been considered a subspecies of barred owl (Strix varia) or even a barred owl that included what is now the fulvous owl (Strix fulvescens). However, since 2010, vocal and genetic differences have been shown to warrant its treatment as a species in its own right according to the International Ornithological Committee (IOC) and the Clements taxonomy. However, as of December 2020 the BirdLife International Handbook of the Birds of the World retain it as a subspecies of barred owl.

Description

Very few specimens of cinereous owl have been measured. It has grayish white to browish gray facial disks surrounded by darker brown and buffy bars. Its underparts are pale buff to white with dark streaks.

Distribution

The cinerous owl appears to occur in three disjunct areas. The largest is along the Sierra Madre Oriental between San Luis Potosi in the north and Veracruz in the south. The next largest is a band from Durango south to Michoacán and the third is a relatively small area in Guerrero. It is believed to formerly have occurred in Oaxaca.

Behavior

Feeding

Little is known about the cinereous owl's foraging strategy or diet, but both are assumed to be similar to that of the barred owl. That species is semi-nocturnal to nocturnal and is an opportunistic predator on small mammals and lagomorphs, small birds, reptiles, and invertebrates.

Breeding

The only information about the cinereous owl's breeding phenology comes from the observation of a fledgling of unknown age in Nayarit in early June. It had well-developed flight feathers but downy body plumage.

Vocalization

The first recordings of the cinereous owl's vocalizations were made in 2015 and very few since then. It has a variety of hoots and other calls.

Status

The IUCN has not assessed the status of the cinereous owl, and "every aspect of the biology of Cinereous Owl is in dire need of more research."

References

Further reading
König, Weick and Becking. 1999. "Owls: A Guide to the Owls of the World". Yale University Press

cinereous owl
Endemic birds of Mexico
cinereous owl
Taxa named by Robert Ridgway
Birds of the Sierra Madre Oriental